LAC Group, formerly known as Library Associates Companies (LAC), is an information services vendor for research and intelligence, library operations, spend and cost management and media archiving. The company provides skilled staffing and consulting services primarily to law firms, Fortune 1000 corporations and government agencies.

History
LAC Group was founded in 1986 by Deb Schwarz as a staffing agency specializing in law libraries.

By 1989, it was offering technical services and serving other academic and other special 
libraries.  In 1999, Library Associates caused a stir in library circles and gained national attention when they were selected by Pillsbury Madison & Sutro LLP to manage their library operations.

The company continued its expansion into different markets with its acquisition of Medical Library Consultants (MLC) from Betsey Beamish in 2001 and of Sanad Support Technologies from Jodi 
and Fuad Suleiman in 2003.  With the acquisition of Sanad, Library Associates consisted of two divisions, Library Associates and Library Associates of Maryland, which were integrated as Library Associates Companies in 2007. 

In 2009, the company name was changed to LAC Group. Subsequent acquisitions include spend management consulting firm Chase Cost Management in 2011, film archiving business PRO-TEK Vaults from Eastman Kodak in 2013, and competitive research agency ShiftCentral in 2019.

Services 
LAC Group's service lines of business include: Consulting & Project Management, Information & Asset Management, Library Staffing & Research Services, Legal Staffing, Managed Services, and Recruiting.

Notes

See also
 Outsourcing
 Recruitment process outsourcing

References

 Alt URL

Library-related organizations
Companies based in Los Angeles County, California
Organizations established in 1986
Employment agencies of the United States
Privately held companies based in California
1986 establishments in California
Competitive intelligence
Business services companies established in 1986